Giclée is a neologism, ultimately derived from the French word gicleur, coined in 1991 by printmaker Jack Duganne for fine art digital prints made using inkjet printers. The name was originally applied to fine art prints created on a modified Iris printer in a process invented in the late 1980s. It has since been used widely to mean any fine-art printing, usually archival, printed by inkjet. It is often used by artists, galleries, and print shops for their high quality printing, but is also used generically for art printing of any quality.

Origins 

The word giclée was adopted by Jack Duganne around 1990. He was a printmaker working at Nash Editions. He wanted a name for the new type of prints they were producing on a modified Iris printer, a large-format, high-resolution industrial prepress proofing inkjet printer on which the paper receiving the ink is attached to a rotating drum. The printer was adapted for fine-art printing. Duganne wanted a word that would differentiate such prints from regular commercial Iris prints then used as proofs in the commercial printing industry. Giclée is based on the French word gicleur, the French technical term for a jet or a nozzle, and the associated verb gicler (to squirt out). Une giclée (noun) means a spurt of some liquid. The French verb form gicler means to spray, spout, or squirt. Duganne settled on the noun giclée.

Current usage 

In addition to its original association with Iris prints, the word giclée has come to be loosely associated with other types of inkjet printing including processes that use dyes or fade-resistant, archival inks (pigment-based), and archival substrates primarily produced on Canon, Epson, HP and other large-format printers. These printers use the CMYK  (Cyan, Magenta, Yellow and Black) color process as a base with additional color cartridges for smoother gradient transitions (such as light magenta, light cyan, light and very light gray), up to 12 different inks in top model printers (orange, green, violet (Epson); red, green, blue (HP); 11+ Chroma Optimizer [a clearcoat] (Canon)) to achieve larger color gamut. A wide variety of substrates on which an image can be printed with such inks are available, including various textures and finishes such as matte photo paper, watercolor paper, cotton canvas, pre-coated canvas, or textured vinyl.

Applications 

Artists generally use inkjet printing to make reproductions of their original two-dimensional artwork, photographs, or computer-generated art. Professionally produced inkjet prints are much more expensive on a per-print basis than the four-color offset lithography process traditionally used for such reproductions. A large-format inkjet print can cost more than ten times that of a four-color offset litho print of the same image in a run of 1,000, not including scanning and color correction. Four-color offset lithographic presses have the disadvantage of the full job having to be set up and produced all at once in a mass edition. With inkjet printing the artist does not have to pay for the expensive printing plate setup or the marketing and storage needed for large four-color offset print runs. This allows the artist to follow a just-in-time business model in which inkjet printing can be an economical option, since art can be printed and sold individually in accordance with demand. Inkjet printing has the added advantage of allowing artists to take total control of the production of their images, including the final color correction and the substrates being used. As a result, numerous individual artists own and operate their own printers.

See also 

 Printmaking
 Digital printing
 Canvas print

References

External links 

 Offman, Craig. The New Remasters, Wired.com

Printmaking
Computer printers
1991 neologisms
Technology neologisms